Muamer Salibašić (born 13 December 1984) is a Bosnian-Herzegovinian footballer who plays as a midfielder for Sarawak FA in Malaysia Premier League.

He started his career with NK Pomorac Kostrena, but represented mostly the reserve team, going on to have a one-year spell with NK Podgrmeč in Bosnia and Herzegovina.

Club career
He left Omladinac Mionica in February 2011 for Turkish Süper Lig outfit Konyaspor. In December 2011, Salibašić confirmed he would join Czech second tier club Varnsdorf from Budućnost Banovići.

Sarawak FA
On 14 April 2013, Sarawak FA announced that they had failed to reach an agreement with NK Podgrmeč over the transfer of Muamer Salibasic and that he would join the club on a one-year deal, prior to the start of the 2013 season. However, Salibasic’s transfer comes at a surprise after major newspapers reported that the player had failed to obtain his ITC from his old club NK Podgrmeč, and Sarawak was trying out new player. On 16 April, 11th hours before transfer windows closed, the Malaysia Premier League side completed the signing and Muamer Salibasic was awarded the number 10 shirt.

Salibasic made his Sarawak debut on 20 April against Perlis FA at Sarawak State Stadium in a 2–0 win as he provided two assists for Joseph Kalang Tie and Bobby Gonzales to give Sarawak the first two goals scored. On 14 May 2013, he scored his first goal league in the season game against PDRM FA, netting Sarawak's second goal in a 3–1 home win. He scored his next goal on 27 April, where he scored the penalty kick as Sarawak huge win 7–0 home against NS Betaria.

On 24 June 2013, Salibasic scored a goal in Sarawak FA 4–0 win  in a two match final against Kuala Lumpur FA, as Crocs were finally crowned champions of the Premier League 2013.

On 21 September 2013, Muamer Salibasic scored the first hat-trick of his career in Sarawak's final group D match of the Malaysia Cup 2013, a 6–1 home win against Perak. A two-week later during a second leg of quarter final match, Salibasic scored his second ever professional hat-trick again in a Malaysia Cup tie against Sime Darby FC 3-1 win as Sarawak FA book their slot into a semi-final.

In January 2017, Salibašić returned to Bosnia to play for Zvijezda Gradačac. He then spent some time with Austrian lower league side SV Mühlbach/Hkg but left them for Second League of the Federation of Bosnia and Herzegovina side Lokomotiva Miričina in February 2018.

Honours

Clubs

Sarawak FA
Malaysia Premier League: 2013

References

External links
 

1984 births
Living people
Sportspeople from Tuzla
Association football forwards
Bosnia and Herzegovina footballers
NK Pomorac 1921 players
FK Željezničar Sarajevo players
Degerfors IF players
NK Čelik Zenica players
Konyaspor footballers
FK Budućnost Banovići players
FK Varnsdorf players
Sarawak FA players
HNK Orašje players
Sabah F.C. (Malaysia) players
NK Zvijezda Gradačac players
Superettan players
Premier League of Bosnia and Herzegovina players
Süper Lig players
First League of the Federation of Bosnia and Herzegovina players
Malaysia Super League players
Bosnia and Herzegovina expatriate footballers
Expatriate footballers in Sweden
Bosnia and Herzegovina expatriate sportspeople in Sweden
Expatriate footballers in Turkey
Bosnia and Herzegovina expatriate sportspeople in Turkey
Expatriate footballers in Malaysia
Bosnia and Herzegovina expatriate sportspeople in Malaysia
Expatriate footballers in Austria
Bosnia and Herzegovina expatriate sportspeople in Austria